Octopoteuthis deletron is a species of squid in the genus Octopoteuthis of the family Octopoteuthidae. They belong to the pelagic squids of order Oegopsida.

O. deletron has been found to break off its arms as a defense strategy. The squid digs hooks in one of its arms into a predator and jets away, leaving the arm in the predator's skin.

The male O. deletron has a penis, which is unusual among squids. Males find it difficult to detect the sex of other individuals they encounter in the dark depths, so they have adopted a strategy of attaching sperm packets to all individuals they meet.

O. deletron are the most common species found in the stomachs of northern elephant seals sampled off the coast of California. It is an important prey item of the giant grenadier. It is also eaten by the enigmatic Perrin's beaked whale (Mesoplodon perrini).

References

External links
 

Squid
Cephalopods of Oceania
Molluscs of the Pacific Ocean
Molluscs described in 1972